Juan Martín del Potro was the defending champion, but withdrew before the tournament, because of illness.
Stanislas Wawrinka defeated David Ferrer 6–1, 6–4 in the final to win the title.

Seeds
The top four seeds receive a bye into the second round.

Draw

Finals

Top half

Bottom half

Qualifying

Seeds

Qualifiers

Draw

First qualifier

Second qualifier

Third qualifier

Fourth qualifier

References
 Main Draw
 Qualifying Draw

Men's Singles